Chinese rapper and singer Lay Zhang (Zhang Yixing) has released four studio albums, four extended plays, seventeen singles and five soundtrack appearances. In May 2016, he released his first solo single called "Monodrama" for the Station project. Zhang made his official solo debut on 7 October 2016 with the release of the song "What U Need?". His first extended play, titled Lose Control, was released on 28 October of the same year. The EP was a commercial success, peaking at number 1 on the Gaon Album Chart and placing seventh on the list of best-selling albums of 2016.

Albums

Studio albums

Single albums

Extended plays

Singles

Promotional singles

Collaborations

Other appearances

Other charted songs

Soundtrack appearances

Music videos

See also
 Exo discography
 List of songs recorded by Exo

Notes

References

Discographies of Chinese artists
Pop music discographies
Chinese music industry
Chinese music-related lists